Harlequin Color may refer to:

 Harlequin (color), a color located between green and yellow
 ChromaFlair, a pigment used in paint systems, primarily for automobiles